The 2011–12 Savannah State Tigers basketball team represents Savannah State University in the 2011–12 NCAA Division I men's basketball season. Their head coach is Horace Broadnax in his seventh year. The Tigers play their home games at the Tiger Arena. After previously playing as a Division I Independent, the Tigers are new members of the Mid-Eastern Athletic Conference. The Tigers were the 2011–12 MEAC regular season champions and received an automatic bid into the 2012 NIT, their first ever appearance in any Division I tournament as a Division I member. The team posted a 21–10 overall mark and lead the MEAC in scoring defense, only allowing 58.9 points per game and were second in the conference in scoring margin (+5.4). In his sixth year as the head coach of the Tigers, Horace Broadnax was named the MEAC Coach of the Year as he guided the team to a 14–2 conference record and the school's first MEAC regular season title.

Roster

Source:  Savannah State Men's Basketball Roster

Schedule

|-
!colspan=8| Exhibition

|-
!colspan=8| Regular Season

|-
!colspan=8| MEAC Tournament

|-
!colspan=8| 2012 NIT

Source:  2011–12 Savannah State Men's Basketball Schedule

References

Savannah State Tigers
Savannah State Tigers basketball seasons
Savannah State Tigers
Savannah State Tigers basketball team
Savannah State Tigers basketball team